Washington Township is one of nine townships in Pike County, Indiana, United States. As of the 2010 census, its population was 4,460 and it contained 2,000 housing units.

Geography
The White River defines the township's northern border, as well as the northern border of Pike County.

Cities, towns, villages
 Petersburg

Unincorporated towns
 Alford at 
 Arda at 
 Ashby Yards at 
 Rogers at 
 West Petersburg at 
 Willisville at 
(This list is based on USGS data and may include former settlements.)

Cemeteries
The township contains these eight cemeteries: Indian Mound, Johnson, Morrison, Old Town, Old Union, Stuckey, Walnut Hill and Walnut Hill.

Major highways

Airports and landing strips
 Whiteriver Airfield

Lakes
 Warner Lake

School districts
 Pike County School Corporation

Political districts
 State House District 64
 State Senate District 48

References
 
 United States Census Bureau 2009 TIGER/Line Shapefiles
 IndianaMap

External links
 Indiana Township Association
 United Township Association of Indiana
 City-Data.com page for Washington Township

Townships in Pike County, Indiana
Jasper, Indiana micropolitan area
Townships in Indiana